The 2016 Sydney Sevens was the fourth tournament of the 2015–16 World Rugby Sevens Series, held over the weekend of 6–7 February 2016 at Sydney Football Stadium in Sydney, Australia. It was the thirteenth edition of the Australian Sevens tournament.

The Cup final was won by New Zealand, defeating Australia by 27–24 in front of a sold-out crowd of over 37,000 fans. Fiji defeated South Africa in the third place play-off.

Format
The teams were divided into pools of four teams each, and a round-robin played within each pool. Points were awarded for each match as 3 for a win, 2 for a draw, 1 for a loss. The top two teams from each pool advanced to the play-offs for the Cup and Plate. The bottom two teams in each pool progressed to the play-offs for the Bowl and Shield

Teams
The sixteen participating teams for the tournament were:

Pool Stage

Pool A

Pool B

Pool C

Pool D

Knockout stage

Shield

Bowl

Plate

Cup

Notes
 The match was Australia's fourth Cup final on home soil. The Australian try scorers were Henry Hutchison, who scored two in the first half, while Sam Myers and Greg Jeloudev each scored a try in the second half. For New Zealand, Rieko Ioane scored a hat-trick, while captain Tim Mikkelson and Kurt Baker each scored a try.

References

External links
 Sydney 7s official webpage 

Australian Sevens
2015–16 World Rugby Sevens Series
Sydney Sevens
Sports competitions in Sydney